Cabourne is a hamlet and civil parish in the West Lindsey district of Lincolnshire, England. It is in the civil parish of Swallow.

The parish church is a Grade II* listed building dedicated to Saint Nicholas. The tower dates from the 11th century, the rest of the church being 15th-century, with a restoration in 1872. During restoration a Norman font was unearthed below the floor. A late 11th- or 12th-century grave marker lies against the east wall of the chancel.

An 1830 Grade II listed octagonal pump house exists here.

Pelham's Pillar is a 128 ft high Grade II listed tower, dating from 1840 to 1849 by E. J. Willson. A plaque above the door commemorates Charles Anderson Pelham, Lord Yarborough who planted 12,532,700 trees in Cabourne High Wood between 1787 and 1828. The column was begun by Pelham's son in 1840, and completed by his grandson in 1849.

References

External links

Villages in Lincolnshire
Civil parishes in Lincolnshire
West Lindsey District